¡Dispara!  (also known as Outrage!) is a 1993 Spanish drama film directed by Carlos Saura, starring Francesca Neri  and Antonio Banderas. The story is a revenge tragedy.

Plot
Marcos, a young reporter, goes to a circus to write a Sunday supplement piece. As he is leaving, the next act is about to start. It involves a woman riding a horse and performing tricks; the presentation ends in shooting balloons from a horse while it is moving. Marcos is taken by the beauty of Anna, the equestrian sharpshooter, and returns to interview her. She invites him to dinner with the troupe. They dance, and then spend the night together. He falls in love with the beautiful horse-riding circus girl. An affair between them ensues; he considers following her around Europe and promises he would follow her to hell. Soon, Marco has to leave to cover a concert in Barcelona.

Fate intervenes when three young mechanics come to repair circus equipment and the owner gives them complimentary tickets for the show. The trio makes a racket as they watch Anna perform. After the show, they follow Anna to her trailer and brutally rape her. Although she is badly hurt, she decides to take matters into her own hands. Bruised, humiliated, and bleeding, she picks up her rifle and goes to hunt them down. She finds them easily at the mechanic shop where they work. She kills them all and leaves without being clearly identified. Anna, who is bleeding badly, has to visit a doctor who reveals to the authorities that she has been raped. The police initially have no clues about the culprit of the triple homicide, but after interviewing the doctor, they begin to suspect Anna.

Anna is stopped in a highway by two officers; she panics and kills them too, a decision that she regrets immediately. Marco who goes to Anna's trailer, finds traces of blood all over the place and he and the authorities go in search of Anna. She finds refuge in a country home where a couple and two small children live. Marcos is responsible for breaking the impasse between Anna and the police, but he arrives too late to help her; the police open fire on her, and she dies in his arms.

Cast

Production
The scene in which Anna kills her rapists was shot before the scene in which she is raped. Francesca Neri, who plays Anna, would have preferred that the two scenes had been shot in temporal order. "I would have used stronger, more intense gestures. Rape, even just cinematic rape, is hard to bear. They take your body away, you don't like your skin anymore, you feel self-hatred," Neri said.

Reception
TV Guide remarked in its 3/5 star review "A well-acted revenge drama, [the film] seems rather anomalous to the career of acclaimed director Carlos Saura... It's not that his skills... aren't in evidence, but that they service a merely workmanlike screenplay... Even if we're not in Charles Bronson-DEATH WISH territory, the film lacks the quirkiness and depth of melodramas like 1988's THE ACCUSED or 1987's SHAME. OUTRAGE piques viewer involvement without ever suggesting that this well-crafted outcry is a project close to the director's heart."

DVD release
¡Dispara! was released in the US on DVD on January 30, 1997 with the English title Outrage!. The transfer and English dubbing is of poor quality and makes it look like Banderas is the main star of the film by prominently featuring him on the DVD cover. The DVD is of pan-and-scan quality and remastered in Dolby Digital Stereo  and was distributed by Allumination.

References

External links
 

1993 films
1993 drama films
Films based on works by Giorgio Scerbanenco
Films directed by Carlos Saura
Madrid in fiction
Spanish drama films
1990s Spanish-language films
Rape and revenge films
Films scored by Alberto Iglesias
Films about violence against women
1990s Spanish films
Spanish films about revenge